This article is based on a translation of an article from the Slovak Wikipedia.

The Peasants' Party of Slovakia (Roľnícka strana Slovenska, RSS) was a Slovak Party from 1989 to 1997. It was established during the Velvet revolution.

During Slovak parliamentary elections in 1994 the party entered parliament as part of a joint electoral list with the HZDS.

Chairman of the party was Paul Delinga, vice president Miroslav Maxon.

In 1997 the RSS got about 1-2% in the polls and that's why merged with the Movement of the Farmers of the Slovak Republic (Hnutím poľnohospodárov SR, HP SR).

The name of the new Party was New Agrarian Party (Nová agrárna strana, NAS). Chairman of the NAS was Paul Delinga, too. 1998 the NAS merged with the then governing party HZDS.

References
 Rose, Richard and Neil Munro. 2009. Parties and Elections in New European Democracies. European Consortium for Political Research Press.

See also
Politics of Slovakia
List of political parties in Slovakia

Defunct political parties in Slovakia
Organizations of the Revolutions of 1989
Velvet Revolution
1989 establishments in Slovakia
1997 disestablishments in Slovakia
Defunct agrarian political parties